Father Bom (Swedish: Pappa Bom) is a 1949 Swedish comedy film directed by Lars-Eric Kjellgren and starring Nils Poppe, Gunnar Björnstrand and Sif Ruud. The film's sets were designed by the art director Nils Svenwall. It was part of a series starring Poppe as Fabian Bom. A number of Swedish sports stars appeared as themselves.

Cast
 Nils Poppe as 	Fabian Bom
 Gunnar Björnstrand as 	Fritjof Krafft
 Else-Merete Heiberg as 	Lena Brodin
 Sif Ruud as 	Adela Pettersson, änka
 Julia Cæsar as 	Euphemia Olsson 
 Arne Lindblad as 	Anton Söderberg
 Nils Hallberg as Sprallis
 Rolf Botvid as 	Fimpen
 Georg Adelly as Puman
 Torsten Tegnér as Self
 Olle Tandberg as 	Self
 Henry Carlsson as 	Self 
 Arne Andersson as 	Self
 Henry Kälarne as 	Self
 Åke Spångert as 	Self
 Åke Seyffarth as 	Self
 Margit Andelius as 	Skvallerkäring i buss
 Märta Arbin as 	Barnavårdslärare
 Helga Brofeldt as 	Skvallerkäring i buss 
 Ernst Brunman as 	Trafikkonstapel Brakbälg 
 Arthur Fischer as Värvare från Småköpings idrottsförening 
 Sigge Fürst as 	Speaker vid idrottstävlingen
 Mona Geijer-Falkner as 	Hyresgäst 
 Gustaf Lövås as 	Värvare från Lyckeby idrottsförening
 Hanny Schedin as 	Hulda Söderberg, Antons hustru 
 Rune Stylander as Idrottsman

References

Bibliography 
 McIlroy, Brian. World Cinema: Sweden. Flicks Books, 1986.
 Qvist, Per Olov & von Bagh, Peter. Guide to the Cinema of Sweden and Finland. Greenwood Publishing Group, 2000.

External links 
 

1949 films
Swedish comedy films
1949 comedy films
1940s Swedish-language films
Films directed by Lars-Eric Kjellgren
1940s Swedish films